Tartu Song Festival arena is a song arena in Tartu, Estonia. The arena hosts various open-air concerts, festivals and staging performances in summer. The arena's area is about 1 ha.

The arena was re-opened on June 1994. The stage can accommodate about 5,000 singers. The arena capacity is about 15,000 people and the number of seats are about 10,000.

See also
 Tallinn Song Festival Grounds

References

External links
 About arena, arena.ee

Buildings and structures in Tartu
Music venues in Estonia
Tourist attractions in Tartu